Bedtime Story is a 1964 American comedy film made by Marlon Brando's company, Pennebaker Productions. It was directed by Ralph Levy and produced by Stanley Shapiro, with Robert Arthur as executive producer, from a screenplay by Shapiro and Paul Henning. The music score was by Hans J. Salter and the cinematography by Clifford Stine. The film stars Marlon Brando, David Niven and Shirley Jones.

The film has been the basis for two remakes: 1988's Dirty Rotten Scoundrels, starring Steve Martin and Michael Caine; and 2019's The Hustle, starring Anne Hathaway and Rebel Wilson.

Plot
Lawrence Jameson is a refined, elegant con artist living in the French Riviera town of Beaumont-sur-Mer, where he masquerades as the deposed prince of a small European country, seducing wealthy women into donating money and jewellery to his revolutionary "cause". Meanwhile, Corporal Freddy Benson is a small-time operator in the US Army stationed in Germany, conning his way into the hearts and finances of young women with sob stories about his sick grandmother. His attempt at seducing the daughter of a local Burgomaster (a mayor) backfires when her father arrives home early, but Freddy is able to blackmail his colonel into giving him an early discharge.

On a train to Beaumont-Sur-Mer, Freddy cockily displays his skill as a conman to Lawrence, whom he believes to be a henpecked husband. Lawrence, believing Freddy's "poaching" will endanger his own activities, attempts to distract him into leaving town, and when that fails, arranges for his arrest. Lawrence has him released and buys him a plane ticket to America. Unfortunately, one of Lawrence's former conquests is on the plane and gives away Lawrence's deception. Freddy returns and blackmails Lawrence into taking him on as an apprentice.

Freddy is taught to play The Prince's mentally challenged brother Ruprecht, a tactic to scare women away from trying to marry the prince. They are successful, but when Lawrence refuses to pay Freddy until he can acquire the culture necessary for Lawrence's style of con, Freddy decides to set out on his own. Lawrence believes that there is not enough room in Beaumont-Sur-Mer for both of them, so the two make a bet: The first one to steal $25,000 from a selected mark will stay, and the other must leave forever.

They choose Janet Walker, a naïve American heiress, as their target. Freddy poses as a soldier who is suffering from psychosomatic paralysis. He wins Janet's affections with a sad story and convinces her that he needs $25,000 to pay for treatment by a celebrated Swiss psychiatrist, Dr. Emile Shauffhausen. Lawrence then masquerades as Dr. Shauffhausen, agreeing to treat Freddy's "condition" with the stipulation that Janet pay the $25,000 directly to him. The two battle for Janet's affections, ruthlessly sabotaging each other, with the worldly Lawrence mostly coming out on top.

Lawrence discovers that Janet is not wealthy after all, but merely a contest winner, and that she intends to sell off the remainder of her winnings to pay for Freddy's treatment. Since he only preys on wealthy women who can afford it, Lawrence attempts to call off the bet. Freddy refuses, but suggests that they change the bet: the first to get her into bed will win. Lawrence refuses to try to seduce Janet, but bets that Freddy will fail to do so.

Freddy has Lawrence kidnapped by some paratroopers whom he fools into believing Lawrence is trying to steal his girl (Janet). He then convinces Janet of his love by "conquering" his paralysis and walking. Lawrence has been present the whole time, and he now declares that Freddy is cured. Lawrence explains that he told the soldiers he had been a British Army paratrooper during the war, and filled them in on Freddy's lies. The angry soldiers keep Freddy occupied until Lawrence puts Janet on a train. However, as the train is departing, Janet receives a telegram stating that Dr. Emil Shauffausen has been dead for over 40 years. Confused and distraught, she returns to her hotel room, where she finds Freddy, who apparently succeeds in seducing her.

Lawrence gracefully accepts defeat, but Freddy surprisingly has had a change of heart: he could not take advantage of Janet, and realises that his feelings for her are genuine. Instead, he marries her, goes straight, and they return to America. Lawrence reflects that, in the end, Freddy is happier than he, but as he sees his next mark, a ravishing and extremely wealthy blonde, concludes that "a man must learn to live with his misery".

Production 
It was filmed on location at Cannes, and was written and produced by Stanley Shapiro.

Reception
The rentals accruing to distributors, not total gross, is estimated at $3 million.

Cast
Marlon Brando as Freddy Benson
David Niven as Lawrence Jameson
Shirley Jones as Janet Walker
Dody Goodman as Fanny Eubank
Aram Stephan as Andre
Parley Baer as Col. Williams
Marie Windsor as Mrs. Sutton
Rebecca Sand as Miss Trumble
Frances Robinson as Miss Harrington
Henry Slate as Sattler
Norman Alden as Dubin
Susanne Cramer as Anna
Cynthia Lynn as Frieda
Ilse Taurins as Hilda
Francine York as Gina

References

External links
 
 
 

1964 films
1964 comedy films
American comedy films
1960s English-language films
Films about con artists
Films directed by Ralph Levy
Films set in Germany
Films set on the French Riviera
Universal Pictures films
Films scored by Hans J. Salter
1960s American films
1964 directorial debut films